|}
Otis Burrell (born May 9, 1944) is an American track and field athlete, primarily known for the high jump where he is a four time American champion outdoors, including three straight victories and a one time indoor champion. Burrell won the silver medal at the 1967 Pan American Games, and was the No.1 ranked American high jumper in 1965, 1966 and 1969.

Burrell attended Jefferson High School in Los Angeles, where he competed in the high jump, and was in a three-way tie for first place at the 1962 CIF California State Meet.  Jefferson is the same high school as Olympic champion Charles Dumas, the first man to jump 7 feet.  Burrell was the ninth.  Burrell then went to Los Angeles Valley College and University of Nevada, Reno.  While at Reno, he was the 1966 NCAA Champion, as well as finishing fourth in the 120 yard hurdles.  Both colleges elected Burrell to their athletic Halls of Fame.  Burrell now coaches for Palos Verdes Peninsula High School.

Burrell remains active in masters athletics, competing in the high jump and hurdles.

References

Living people
1944 births
American male high jumpers
University of Nevada, Reno alumni
Pan American Games medalists in athletics (track and field)
Pan American Games silver medalists for the United States
Athletes (track and field) at the 1967 Pan American Games
Masters athletes
Jefferson High School (Los Angeles) alumni
Track and field athletes from Los Angeles
Medalists at the 1967 Pan American Games